The black Russian is a cocktail of vodka and coffee liqueur. It contains 50 ml vodka and 20 ml coffee liqueur, per IBA specified ingredients. 

The drink is made by pouring the vodka and coffee liqueur over ice cubes or cracked ice in an old-fashioned glass and stirring. The black Russian is often garnished with a lemon slice and a Luxardo maraschino cherry on a stick.

History 
The black Russian cocktail first appeared in 1949 and is ascribed to Gustave Tops, a Belgian barman, who created it at the Hotel Metropole in Brussels in honor of Perle Mesta, then United States Ambassador to Luxembourg. The cocktail owes its name to the use of vodka, a typical Russian spirit, and the blackness of the coffee liqueur.

Variations
 Dirty black Russian, tall black Russian, Australian black Russian or Colorado bulldog: served in a highball glass and topped up with cola.
 Black magic: served with a dash of lemon juice and a lemon twist to garnish.
 Irish Russian or smooth black Russian: served with a head of Guinness.
 Brown Russian: served in a highball glass and topped with ginger ale.
 Belarusian or white Russian: served with milk or cream.
 Mudslide: served with Irish cream, either fresh cream or ice cream, with or without chocolate sauce rim.
 Mind eraser: topped up with sparkling water.
 Paralyzer: Made with cola and milk in addition to vodka and coffee liqueur.

See also
 List of cocktails

References

Cocktails with vodka
Cocktails with coffee liqueur
Coffee culture
Coffee drinks
Alcoholic coffee drinks
Two-ingredient cocktails